Charles Robert Worthington (28 February 1877 – 7 December 1950) was an English first-class cricketer active 1898 who played for Kent. He was born in Surbiton; died in Victoria, British Columbia.

References

1877 births
1950 deaths
English cricketers
Kent cricketers
Cambridge University cricketers